My Brother's War (also known as Flashpoint) is a 1997 American film directed by and starring James Brolin.

It was filmed in Ireland for Concorde Anois.

Plot
In Northern Ireland, brothers Gerry and Liam are members of the Provisional Irish Republican Army. In the wake of the peace process, Gerry wants to follow ethical principles, while Liam knows no limits; this leads them to a divide and Liam forms a splinter group. A CIA agent and the support of Mary will force Gerry to stop his brother.

Cast
Jennie Garth as Mary Fagan Bailey
James Brolin as John Hall
Patrick Foy as Gerry Fallon
Salvator Xuereb as Liam Fallon
Gary Cooke as  Brian Fagan
Tony Boston as Aidan
Seamus Fox as Bobby
Lesley Conroy as Frances O'Brien
Emma O'Neill as Sinead
Josh Brolin as Pete
Mike Regan as Michael Fallon
Conal O'Fatharta as 12-year-old Gerry
Michael McNally as 8-year-old Liam
Cristi Conaway as Kelly Hall (as Kristi Conaway)
Craig Warnock as Conal Byrne
John Slattery as Devlin
Bill Murphy as Paddy

Production
The film was shot in Ireland. Brolin was visited during filming by his then girlfriend Barbra Streisand.

"I really wanted to support Jim, because I knew how difficult it was to direct a movie that you're in," Streisand said. "I had been with men who were not so supportive when I was doing a movie. So I really wanted to give him what I felt I didn't get. I would get up at 5 and give him breakfast and help him through that ordeal. It was just a very loving intimate experience to live in a house with a thatched roof."

Reception
In his book The IRA on Film and Television: A History, Mark Connelly cites the film as one of the films featuring the IRA that presents its acts as belonging to a "splinter" group at odds with the "official" IRA in an attempt to avoid political commentary, which Connelly argues "grant[s] a cloak of legitimacy to the IRA by blaming violence and extremism on lone malcontents."

Awards
The film was named Best Feature Film with a budget over $1 million at the 1997 Hollywood Film Festival.

See also
 Patriot Games

References

External links
 
 
 

1997 films
1997 action thriller films
1990s political thriller films
American action thriller films
American political thriller films
Films about the Irish Republican Army
Films about The Troubles (Northern Ireland)
Films set in Northern Ireland
1990s English-language films
1990s American films